Burgemeester Damen Sportpark is a park located in Geleen, Netherlands. It was the location of the Pinkpop Festival from 1970 to 1986.

References

Parks in Limburg (Netherlands)